Stipa turkestanica is a species of grass that grows in India and Central Asia and western Asia. Its culms are 30–70 cm long, and panicles 8–14 cm long, bearing few spikelets.

References
 Hack. 1906. In: Trudy Imp. S.-Peterburgsk. Bot. Sada 26: 59
 Trudy Imperatorskago S.-Peterburgskago Botaničeskago Sada 26: 59. 1906. (Trudy Imp. S.-Peterburgsk. Bot. Sada)
 Type fragment: Hackel, E. 1906. Trudy Imp. S.-Peterburgsk. Bot. Sada. 26: 59.
 The Plant List entry
 Encyclopedia of Life entry
 GrassBase entry

turkestanica
Plants described in 1906